Demand signal repository (DSR) is the data warehouse designed to integrate and cleanse demand data, and leverage that data to consumer goods manufacturers, service retailers, and end customers efficiently. Cleansing it and synchronizing it with syndicated and internal data allows companies to provide business users with a more complete view of their retail performance. The repository itself is a database that stores the information in a format that allows for easy retrieval of information so that users can quickly query the database to identify what's selling, where, when and how. Identifying Out-of-Stock's (OOS's) is a requirement. Leveraging that data to perform predictive analytics is where applications actually leverage POS within their data model to help identify both current and potential impact.

With the right architecture, a DSR will grow with the business needs. It will be leveraged across multiple business groups including category management, supply chain, inventory management, promotion and event management, sales, marketing, etc.

Users should be able to use any tools needed for their specific job requirements. If they can't, then you have a point solution that is proprietary and not a true DSR. An open architecture should have an intuitive user interface that lets users easily get reports to help them understand their sales, manage category and brand information, etc. Users should easily be able to drag, drop and drill into information. They should be able to pull data from multiple data sets, share reports securely, create alerts, etc. In addition, users that have specific job requirements, such as price elasticity or analyzing promotional ROI, etc. that aren't handled in their DSR may have an alternate tool they need to use which leverages POS data. A properly designed DSR will allow other tools (in addition to their own tool) to leverage POS data.

Alerts will pin-point areas of the business that require immediate attention. The goal of a DSR is to provide faster access to more information, improve retailer relationships, maximize ROI, streamline internal efficiencies, and improve performance at all stages of the supply chain and support multiple departments and teams.

References

External links
 Keys to DSR Success Consumer Goods Technology Magazine, June 2011

Supply chain management
Market research
Strategic management